The Steamboat Pilot & Today is an American newspaper serving Routt County, Colorado and owned by Swift Communications. The Steamboat Pilot & Today is a free tabloid published daily.

As of 2011, The Pilot & Today has been named the top newspaper in its circulation class eight times in nine years by the Colorado Press Association.

History
Steamboat Pilot was a weekly newspaper established in Steamboat Springs, Colorado and first printed on July 31, 1885, by James Hoyle. It merged with The Routt County Sentinel in 1927, and later with The Oak-Creek Times-Leader in 1944. Jack Kent Cooke acquired the Pilot in 1988. Steamboat Today was first published as a daily tabloid newspaper on August 21, 1989, as an accompaniment to the Pilot. In 1994, WorldWest acquired the papers from the Cooke estate. WorldWest was owned by the Simmons family, which also owned the Lawrence Journal-World.

In 2008, ExploreSteamboat.com, the website of affiliated magazine Explore Steamboat was nominated for the EPpy Awards as Best Regional Magazine-Affiliated Web Site.

In June 2016, the newspaper was acquired by Swift Communications.

References

Newspapers published in Colorado
Publications established in 1885
Routt County, Colorado
1885 establishments in Colorado